The French ironclad Thétis was a wooden-hulled armored corvette built for the French Navy in the late 1860s. She was named for the Greek sea-goddess Thetis. During the Franco-Prussian War of 1870–1871 she was assigned to a squadron of French ships that attempted to blockade the Prussian ports in the Baltic Sea in 1870. She accidentally rammed her sister  in 1877. En route to the Pacific in 1884 her propeller fell off and she had to return to France under sail. Thétis was eventually hulked in New Caledonia.

Design and description

The s were designed as improved versions of the armored corvette  suitable for foreign deployments. Unlike their predecessor the Alma-class ships were true central battery ironclads as they were fitted with armored transverse bulkheads. Like most ironclads of their era they were equipped with a metal-reinforced ram.

Her crew numbered 316 officers and men.

Propulsion
The ship had a single horizontal return connecting-rod steam engine driving a single propeller. Her engine was powered by four oval boilers. On sea trials the engine produced  and the ship reached . Unlike all of her sisters except , she had two funnels, mounted side-by-side.

Armament
Thétis mounted her four  Modèle 1864 breech-loading guns in the central battery on the battery deck. The other two 194-millimeter guns were mounted in barbettes on the upper deck, sponsoned out over the sides of the ship. The four  guns were also mounted on the upper deck. She may have exchanged her Mle 1864 guns for Mle 1870 guns. The guns could fire both solid shot and explosive shells.

Armor
The unarmored portions of her sides were protected by  iron plates.

Service
Thétis, named for the Greek sea-goddess Thetis, was laid down at Toulon in 1865 and launched on 22 August 1867. The ship began her sea trials on 1 May 1868 and was put into reserve at Brest the following year. She was commissioned on 20 July 1870 for the Franco-Prussian War and assigned to the Northern Squadron. On 24 July 1870 she departed Cherbourg in company with the rest of the Northern Squadron and they cruised off the Danish port of Frederikshavn between 28 July and 2 August until they entered the Baltic Sea. The squadron, now renamed the Baltic Squadron, remained in the Baltic, attempting to blockade Prussian ports on the Baltic until ordered to return to Cherbourg on 16 September. The ship was assigned to the Evolutionary Squadron in 1871 and detached to the Levant Squadron the following year.

During the Cantonal Revolution Thétis and her sister  spent much of September–October 1873 in the port of Cartagena, Spain where they could protect French citizens. She became the temporary flagship of Vice Admiral Roze after 31 October 1875 when the armored frigate  caught fire and exploded in Toulon. Thétis was paid off on 1 March 1876, but was recommissioned on 18 April 1877 for service with the Evolutionary Squadron.

On 3 July 1877 she accidentally rammed Reine Blanche who had to be run ashore to prevent her from sinking. The ship was in reserve between 1878 and 1881 although she was intended to be used as the flagship of the Pacific Squadron. Her sister  was sent instead. On 8 October 1885 she was commissioned as the flagship of Rear Admiral Marcq de St. Hilaire and sailed for the Pacific. She ended her days as a hulk in Nouméa, New Caledonia.

Notes

Footnotes

References

External links

Ships built in France
Alma-class ironclads
1867 ships